William McBryar (February 14, 1861 – March 8, 1941) was a Buffalo Soldier in the United States Army and a recipient of America's highest military decoration, the Medal of Honor, for his actions during the Cherry Creek Campaign in Arizona Territory.

Early life and St. Augustine's Normal College 
William McBryar was born February 14, 1861, in Elizabethtown, North Carolina to Rose Black.  McBryar attended St. Augustine's Normal College starting in 1883 and entered the collegiate program in 1885.  On his individual service report, his listed "physics, political [economy], science of government, sociology" as areas of professional or scientific study and investigation other than military. He also wrote that he studied "Latin and Spanish" and was able to speak Spanish. He left college one year prior to graduating and appeared as a laborer in New York on the census.

10th Cavalry and Indian Campaign 
McBryar enlisted in the 10th Cavalry on January 3, 1887, for a period of five years and requested assignment on the frontier.  A Buffalo Soldier in the United States Army, he received America's highest military decoration the Medal of Honor for his actions during the March 7, 1890, Cherry Creek Campaign in Arizona Territory while serving as a sergeant in Company K of the 10th Cavalry Regiment.  On that day, he participated in an engagement in Arizona where he "[d]istinguished himself for coolness, bravery and marksmanship while his troop was in pursuit of hostile Apache Indians."  For his actions, Sergeant McBryar was awarded the Medal of Honor two months later, on May 15, 1890.

Medal of Honor citation
Rank and organization: Sergeant, Company K, 10th U.S. Cavalry. Place and date: Salt River, Arizona, 7 March 1890. Entered service at: New York, N.Y. Birth: 14 February 1861, Elizabethtown, N.C. Date of issue: 15 May 1890.

Citation:

25th Infantry, Spanish American War, and Commission 
He reenlisted in the 25th Infantry and was deployed to the Spanish American War, serving with distinction at the Battle of El Caney, Cuba.

Capt E. A. Edwards, Capt, 25th Infantry wrote to the Adjutant General State of North Carolina in a May 30, 1898, stating

A second letter furnished to McBryar from 1LT V.A. Caldwell in 1898 reads

For his gallantry, he received a commission as a First Lieutenant in the 8th U. S. Volunteer Infantry.  A letter from the Adjutant General's Office, Washington dated September 7, 1898, to Col Huggins, Fort Thomas, Kentucky, states "McBryar, Goings and Gaither this day commissioned."  LT McBryar accepted via Western Union Telegraph on September 13, 1898.

8th Immunes and Philippine Insurrection 
McBryar was sworn in as a first lieutenant in the 8th U.S. Volunteer Infantry September 22, 1898, at Fort Thomas, Kentucky.  His oath of office reads:

1st Lieut. Wm. McBryar, 8th U.S. Vols., requests to be appointed in the 9th Vol. Infantry, as his regiment is about to be mustered out. McBryar got the medal of honor for gallantry in action against the Apaches March 8, 1890, and that and his gallantry at San Juan, secured him his present commission.  He has hardly served long enough as a commissioned officer to reimburse him for his outfit, but the trouble is that we have a number of similar applications, and the few remaining immune regiments will not afford vacancies enough for more than one or two, and they are likely to be mustered out any day. His case appears certainly to be as deserving as any, but the best, that can be done is to keep him on the waiting list until a vacancy occurs, and then resubmit the case. In one respect he is better off than some other applicants, inasmuch as the expiration of his present commission he reverts to his position as Sergeant in the regular Army, and his service in the Vols. is credited in his longevity.

He accepted a commission as a 2LT in the 49th U.S. Volunteer Infantry and served with Company M, Piat, Luzon, Philippines during the Philippine–American War. In May 1900 he led a group of soldiers that captured an enemy guerilla unit in Cagayan. He was mustered out with his unit on June 1, 1900, at Presidio, California.

Enlistment in the 9th Cavalry 
McBryar reenlisted in 1905.  A Declaration for Original Invalid Pension filed in the state of North Carolina, county of Guilford states

On this 8th day of June A. D. one thousand nine hundred and eleven personally appeared before me, a notary public within and for the county and State aforesaid, William McBryar, aged 50 years, a resident of Greensboro, county of Guilford resident of Greensboro, State of North Carolina, who being sworn according to law, declares that he is the identical person who was ENROLLED at Hickory, NC under the name of William McBryar on the 22d day of February, 1905, as a private in Troop G, 9th Cavalry (U.S.A.) and was DISCHARGED at Fort Leavenworth, Kans on the 19th day of December, 1905; that his personal description at enlistment was a follows:  Age 42 years; height, 5 feet 5 1/2 inches; complexion [illegible] light; hair, grey; eyes, Bro #1.  That while a member of the organization aforesaid, in the service and in the line of his duty at Fort Leavenworth, Kans. on or about the 22d day of March, 1905 he contracted rheumatism in his legs; that said rheumatism was of a mild nature at first, but is gradually growing worse, and is so severe at times as to render him unable to walk except by the aid of [illegible].  That he was treated in hospital as follows:  at Fort Leavenworth, Kans.  In hospital as stated above only.  That he was employed in the military or naval service prior to February, 1905.  That he has not been employed in the military or naval service since December 19, 1905.

He was discharged from the 9th Cavalry to accept a position in the U.S. Civil Service.

Demobilization and marriage 
He married Sallie B. Waugh on December 10, 1906, in Greensboro, North Carolina by Reverend J.G. Walker.  A record is on file at the Greensboro, North Carolina Court House.  This was the first marriage for both McBryar and Waugh, and no children were born to this union.  Waugh died in 1928 and McBryar remarried Lucy E. Sweatt of Lynch, Kentucky on July 13, 1933.  However, the marriage failed and ended in divorce on July 20, 1938.

Watchman at Arlington National Cemetery 
McBryar worked as a watchman at the Arlington National Cemetery in 1909.

Later career 
After returning to his farm for two years, McBryar then taught as a military instructor at Saint Paul's Normal and Industrial School near Lawrenceville, Virginia for one year from 1911-1912. He began working for the Federal Penitentiary Service at the federal prison on McNeil Island in Washington state at noon on March 20, 1914.  McBryar had several jobs after this. He taught at a school from 1924 - 1928. He then attended school for four years. McBryar returned to teaching again in 1935.

Tennessee State Agricultural and Industrial College 
He graduated Tennessee Agricultural and Industrial State University in 1934 at the age of 73 with a Bachelor of Science degree in Agriculture.

In 1935, he wrote the following essay, which was published in The Bulletin in May, 1935:

Death and burial 
He died at age 80 at Mercy Hospital, Philadelphia, Pennsylvania of cerebral thrombosis with arteriosclerosis as a contributory cause.  He was buried in Arlington National Cemetery, Arlington County, Virginia.  On December 16, 2017, members of Tennessee State University's Alumni Association took part in the annual Wreaths Across America and laid a memorial wreath at McBryar's grave.

Honors 
Induction into the Pentagon Hall of Heroes

Induction into the Fort Leavenworth Hall of Fame

Induction into the Arizona Veteran's Hall of Fame

Inclusion on the African American Medal of Honor Memorial

Inclusion on the Buffalo Soldiers Memorial at Huntsville, Alabama 

Tennessee State Senate Resolution honoring his accomplishments

Historic Markers 
A historical marker in Elizabethtown, North Carolina marks the site of McBryar's childhood home.  A second historical marker was unveiled at Tennessee State University in March 2018.

Topps baseball card 
In 2009, Topps baseball cards produced a series of cards highlighting Medal of Honor recipients.  LT William McBryar was featured on card #11.

Northwest Territorial Mint coin 
In 2017, Northwest Territorial Mint produced 100 commemorative coins with McBryar's likeness. They were distributed to veterans at Tennessee State University's Veterans Day ceremony on November 10, 2017.

Portraits 

Three portraits of McBryar are known to exist, an oil wash by artist Jon Kardamis, an oil painting by Samuel Dunson, and a drawing McBryar on horseback by Brandon Van Leer. All three belong to a private collection.  Two are on temporary display at Tennessee State University.  One is located at the Concierge in Phoenix, Arizona.

See also

 List of Medal of Honor recipients
 List of Medal of Honor recipients for the Indian Wars

Notes

References
 Catalogue of St. Augustine's Normal School [1882-1899], pg. 8 (1883-1884); pg. 7 (1884-1885); pg. 7 (1885-1886); http://library.digitalnc.org/cdm/singleitem/collection/yearbooks/id/6307/rec/1.  Retrieved 2017-11-12.
 
 

Buffalo Soldiers
1861 births
1941 deaths
American people of the Indian Wars
United States Army Medal of Honor recipients
United States Army officers
Burials at Arlington National Cemetery
Apache Wars
American Indian Wars recipients of the Medal of Honor
People from Elizabethtown, North Carolina